The 1899 River Plate Rugby Union Championship was the inaugural season of the first rugby union club championship held in Argentina, organised by the "River Plate Rugby Union" (current Argentine Rugby Union). It was contested by the five founding members of the RPRU: Belgrano, Rosario, Lomas, Buenos Aires, and Flores.

Uruguayan club Montevideo C.C. was invited to take part of the competition but they declined to participate due to the long travel time to Argentina by ship.

In the inaugural game, Lomas defeated Buenos Aires by 11-4. Lomas would be the first Argentine champion, winning the title at the end of the season.

Teams 

Notes

Results
List of matches played in the season. Some results are missed (w=indicates win, l=indicates lost). Rosario A.C. entered directly in the semifinals.

First round

Semifinals

Final 
The final was played at Flores Old Ground in Caballito, Buenos Aires. All proceeds were donated to the British Hospital of Buenos Aires. In a match where both teams showed to be equalled in strength of play, Lomas won the game when they were awarded a free-kick that captain F.H. Jacobs scored for a 3–0 win.

Aftermath
It was the first and only championship contested by Flores A.C. A pioneer in several sports disciplines in Argentina, Flores A.C. had played its first match on 19 July 1896, against Buenos Aires F.C. In 1907 Flores Athletic sold some of its facilities to neighbor Club Ferro Carril Oeste, for m$n 700. It is believed that the club was dissolved after this transaction.

Before disappearing, Flores had also took part in the first Primera División championship in 1891. The polo team of the institution also won the fourth edition of Abierto de Polo in 1894.

References

1899 in Argentine rugby union
1899 in sports
1
m